Government Engineering College, Bodinayakanur is a government engineering college in Bodinayakkanur, Theni, Tamilnadu, India. It was established in 2012 and offers courses in different engineering branches.

References

Engineering colleges in Tamil Nadu
Colleges affiliated to Anna University
Theni district
Educational institutions established in 2012
2012 establishments in Tamil Nadu